The 1944 Campeonato Paulista da Primeira Divisão, organized by the Federação Paulista de Futebol, was the 43rd season of São Paulo's top professional football league. Palmeiras won the title for the 10th time. no teams were relegated and the top scorer was São Paulo's Luizinho with 22 goals.

Championship
The championship was disputed in a double-round robin system, with the team with the most points winning the title.

Top Scores

References

Campeonato Paulista seasons
Paulista